
AD 17 (XVII) was a common year starting on Friday (link will display the full calendar) of the Julian calendar. At the time, it was known as the Year of the Consulship of Flaccus and Rufus (or, less frequently, year 770 Ab urbe condita). The denomination AD 17 for this year has been used since the early medieval period, when the Anno Domini calendar era became the prevalent method in Europe for naming years.

Events

By place

Roman Empire 
 May 26 – Germanicus returns to Rome as a conquering hero; he celebrates a triumph for his victories over the Cherusci, Chatti and other Germanic tribes west of the Elbe.
 Emperor Tiberius sends Germanicus to the east, in order to lead a military campaign against Parthia.
 Cappadocia (Asia Minor) becomes a Roman province. 
 Lucius Aelius Sejanus becomes Praetorian prefect.

Europe 
 A civil war begins in Germania.
 Maroboduus, King of the Marcomanni, is defeated by Arminius and his Germanic tribes.

Africa 
 Tacfarinas, Numidian deserter from the Roman army, begins a guerrilla war against the Romans. He leads his own Musulamii tribe and a coalition of Berbers, attacking the Limes Tripolitanus a fortified zone (limes) of the Roman Empire in Africa.

Judea 
 Herod Antipas, son of Herod the Great, builds the city Tiberias on the western shore of the Sea of Galilee, in honor of Tiberius.

Asia Minor 
 An earthquake in Anatolia destroys the city of Sardis and damages several other cities.

Deaths 
 Antiochus III, King of Commagene
 Archelaus, king of Cappadocia
 Gaius Julius Hyginus, Roman Latin writer
 Livy, Roman historian (approximate date)
 Lucius Vipstanus Gallus, Roman senator
 Ovid, Roman poet (or AD 18)

References 

0017

als:10er#17